Grup Gündoğarken (English: Group While Sunrises) was a Turkish popular music group.

The group was founded by İlhan Şeşen in 1983. Other members of the group were Gökhan Şeşen and Burhan Şeşen, both of which are his nephews. Their early performances were mostly incidental music. They collaborated with Levent Kırca and Ferhan Şensoy for the stage. They also played the generic tune for the TV program "Olacak o Kadar", a successful comedy series.
Beginning by 1986, they gave a series of concerts at home and aboard. In 1988, they participated  in the Turkish under contest for the Eurovision song Contest of 1988 by their song "Resimler Resimler", but they couldn't win the contest. Probably their most notable hit was " Ankara'dan Abim Geldi " of 1992. After 1994, the group disbanded. But they still play in some concerts.

Album discography

References

Turkish rock music groups
Musical groups established in 1983
Musical groups disestablished in 1994